{{Infobox Boxingmatch
|fight date    = 22 November 2014
|Fight Name    = Manny Pacquiao vs Chris Algieri
|image         = 
|location      = Cotai Arena, The Venetian, Macau, SAR
|fighter1      = Manny Pacquiao
|nickname1     = Pac-Man
|record1       = 56–5–2 (38 KO)
|hometown1     = General Santos, Philippines
|height1       = 5 ft 6 in
|weight1       = 143.8 lb
|style1        = Southpaw
|recognition1  = WBO welterweight champion[[The Ring (magazine)|The Ring]] No. 4 ranked pound-for-pound fighter8-division world champion
|fighter2      = Chris Algieri
|nickname2     = The Fighting Collegian
|record2       = 20–0 (8 KO)
|hometown2     = Huntington, New York, U.S.
|height2       = 5 ft 10 in
|weight2       = 143.6 lb
|style2        = Orthodox
|recognition2  = Former junior welterweight champion
|titles        = WBO welterweight title
|result        =  Pacquiao wins via 12-round unanimous decision (119-103, 119-103, 120-102)
}}
Manny Pacquiao vs. Chris Algieri, was a boxing welterweight championship fight for the WBO welterweight championship. The bout was held on 22 November 2014 at the Venetian Macau resort & hotel in Macau. Pacquiao won via unanimous decision and retained his WBO welterweight championship.

National anthem singers
United States (The Star-Spangled Banner): Melody Thornton
Philippines (Lupang Hinirang): The Word Choir

Fight RecapBy: Lyle Fitzsimmons | CBSSports.comRound 1: Thirty seconds in, Pacquiao lands a snapping straight left. Drives Algieri to the ropes with a right hand, though not entirely because of a flush landing. Algieri moves well, finally throws a combination after 90 seconds. Pacquiao rushes in and lands at 2:15 mark, doesn't appear to fear counters. Just then, Algieri lands a clean straight right lead. 10-9 PacquiaoRound 2: Algieri jabs more in first 10 seconds than in entire first round, lands left hook as he moves. Algieri's left eye already showing redness. Pacquiao jumps in with left-right-left and it's called a knockdown, though it appears he slipped in the corner. Pacquiao lands overhand right at 2-minute mark that buckles Algieri for a moment, but he spins away. Pacquiao lands left to the body in final 10 seconds. Algieri showing no intention of planting his feet, but he's not yet establishing anything style-wise. 10-9 PacquiaoRound 3: Pacquiao still pressing, but Algieri has landed a couple clean left hooks as lead shots. Pacquiao not yet able to mount sustained offensive action. Pacquiao body shot moves Algieri, and he lands another single right hand in the final 10 seconds. Algieri's best round of the three—he's having isolated moments—but he probably still didn't do enough to win it. 10-9 PacquiaoRound 4: Algieri's corner is exhibiting confidence, but his lack of offense is making it difficult to see him winning any early rounds. Pacquiao scores inside with a short right uppercut at the midway point. Algieri lands a quick right hand with little effect, but it looked good. Pacquiao lands one-two combination with 30 seconds left, while Algieri scores with another right hand in the final 10 seconds. Still not enough attack for the challenger. 10-9 PacquiaoRound 5: Algieri starts round with jabs and lands a straight right as Pacquiao approaches. He eludes a follow-up flurry from the champion, then replies with a right to the body that may have strayed low. The fighters touch glove as a symbolic gesture. Algieri leans in with a straight right to the head and looks more offensive than at any point so far. Pacquiao lunges with a short right and a long left, both miss. 10-9 AlgieriRound 6: Same blueprint early as Round 5, though Pacquiao does land a glancing left hand to the jaw. Algieri lands long right to the body and is warned, though it didn't at all look low. Pacquiao lands left that wobbles Algieri and he falls into a somersault, then rises. Pacquiao charges and drops Algieri in same corner in which he'd slipped earlier, though it may again have been a slip. Unlike the first time, though, this is a legit two-point round. 10-8 PacquiaoRound 7: Algieri moving and flicking shots, but not landing anything noticeable as Pacquiao moves forward. Pacquiao lunges in with four shots midway through the round that don't score, but they show what's been occurring this round—Pacquiao is aggressive, Algieri is doing little to dissuade momentum. Algieri's best punch of the round is another long right hand to the body late, but it can't possibly be enough. At this point, it looks like lasting 12 rounds will be Algieri's best post-fight claim. 10-9 PacquiaoRound 8: Not much of interest in the first half of the round, but Pacquiao counters an Algieri jab with a snapping left with 1:15 remaining. Algieri lands slapping left hook, which prompts another Pacquiao rush. Another snapping jab lands for Algieri in the last 10 seconds. It's getting hard to see many rounds that he's actually winning, though. He simply looks better in surviving some than others. 10-9 AlgieriRound 9: Algieri still moving and flicking. Pacquiao has landed a few lefts as a response. Sudden straight left drops Algieri flat on his back in a corner with 1:15 remaining, he wobbles up at 9. Upon rising, he takes a knee to avoid further damage. Pacquiao shakes off a clinch, continues battering along ropes. Algieri takes a big left-right at the bell. 10-7 PacquiaoRound 10: Algieri's trainer, Tim Lane, is shown on HBO's broadcast before the round telling his man, "We are exactly where we need to be." Ummm... yeah. Algieri boxes and moves through initial 60 seconds of round, before Pacquiao lands a counter that again wobbles him. Algieri ducks to elude Pacquiao feints and almost twists himself to the floor. Another knockdown, the sixth of the night, comes from a left-right-left volley with 15 seconds left. He rises and jukes his way through the rest of the round. 10-8 PacquiaoRound 11: Though his corner is insisting a rally is coming, Algieri looks like a guy who'll be thrilled to see the final bell. Pacquiao lands a straight left and smiles as Algieri rattles backward. Another left hand lands in the final 30 seconds, as it has in nearly every round previously. 10-9 PacquiaoRound 12: Algieri lands a winging right that would have looked good had he not already been down six times. Pacquiao pursuing, but not in a hell-bent-for-leather fashion. Final minute arrives, "Manny, Manny" chant begins. Final 30 seconds, and it looks as if Pacquiao's knockout-less streak will stretch to nine fights. It does. 10-9 Pacquiao''

Manny Pacquiao dominated the bout and scored an official six knockdowns en route to a lopsided victory via unanimous decision by the judges (119-103, 119-103 and 120-102).

In a Bloomberg TV exclusive with Anchor John Dawson, Pacquiao demonstrated how to throw a punch and said the key to success is "discipline, discipline and discipline." He was speaking ahead of his November 2014 fight with Chris Algieri in Macau.

Fight card

Main bouts (HBO PPV)
WBO Welterweight bout: Manny Pacquiao (c) vs. Chris Algieri
Pacquiao won via unanimous decision
Flyweight bout: Zou Shiming vs. Kwanpichit Onesongchaigym
Zou won via unanimous decision
WBO Featherweight bout: Vasiliy Lomachenko (c) vs. Chonlatarn Piriyapinyo
Lomachenko won via unanimous decision
WBA Super Lightweight bout: Jessie Vargas (c) vs. Antonio DeMarco
Vargas won via unanimous decision

International broadcasting

External links

References

Algieri
2014 in boxing
Boxing in Macau
2014 in Macau sport
Boxing on HBO
November 2014 sports events in Asia